Sohawa is one of the major towns in Mandi Bahauddin District in Punjab, Pakistan.  It is situated on the Phalia Road, almost 3 km out of the city of Mandi Bahauddin.  It basically consists of three villages: Sohawa Bolani, Sohawa Jamlani and Sohawa Dilloana and is divided into two Union Councils, Sohawa Bolani(17) and Sohawa Dilloana(18).

References

External links
 Mandi Bahauddin District, Official website
 Sohawa Bolani at wikimapia.

Cities and towns in Mandi Bahauddin District